The Confederation of Asian and Pacific Accountants (CAPA) is a regional organization representing 33 national professional accountancy organizations (PAOs) operating in Asia and the Pacific. These PAOs, referred to as CAPA’s members, represent close to 2 million accountants across the region.

History 
Governor Gregorio S. Licaros, President of the Philippine Institute of Certified Public Accountants, came up with the idea for the CAPA. The first Far East Conference of Accountants was held between November 28 and December 1 of 1957 in Manila, Philippines. The event, said to be the forerunner of CAPA, "created history in the accountancy world as it became the base for various professional accounting bodies in the Far East to confer every few years to discuss and exchange information."

Fourteen countries sent delegates to the first event. Of these fourteen, twelve would go on to be considered the founding members of CAPA. 
 Australia
 Hong Kong
 India
 Indonesia
 Japan
 Korea
 Malaysia
 New Zealand
 Pakistan
 Taiwan
 Thailand
 Philippines
The delegates from the other two countries, England and Netherlands, were sent only as observers.

A second conference was held between March 31 and April 2 of 1960, where Ceylon, Singapore, and the United States of America joined. In order "to reflect the extended membership, the description of the grouping was changed from the 'Far East Conference of Accountants' to the 'Confederation of Asian and Pacific Accountants' (CAPA)." During the 8th CAPA Conference, the CAPA adopted a formal charter, established an Executive Committee and elected its first President, " Gordon M. Macwhinnie.

Past Presidents

Current Board Members 
President: Chen Yugui (China)

Chief Executive: Brian Blood

Membership

References

 

International accounting organizations